Ausonia Mensa is a mensa in the Hellas quadrangle of Mars, located at 30.3° S and 262.3° W. It is  across and was named after an albedo feature name. The term "mensa" is used for a flat-topped prominence with cliff-like edges. Ausonia Mensa has many small channels. Some features look like alluvial fans. These channels add to the mass of evidence that water once flowed on Mars. Images of curved channels have been seen in images from Mars spacecraft dating back to the early 1970s with the Mariner 9 orbiter.

See also

 HiRISE
 HiWish program
 MGS
 Valley networks (Mars)

References

Hellas quadrangle
Mensae on Mars